The Wow! signal was a strong narrowband radio signal detected on August 15, 1977, by Ohio State University's Big Ear radio telescope in the United States, then used to support the search for extraterrestrial intelligence. The signal appeared to come from the direction of the constellation Sagittarius and bore the expected hallmarks of extraterrestrial origin.

Astronomer Jerry R. Ehman discovered the anomaly a few days later while reviewing the recorded data. He was so impressed by the result that he circled on the computer printout the reading of the signal's intensity, "6EQUJ5", and wrote the comment "Wow!" beside it, leading to the event's widely used name.

The entire signal sequence lasted for the full 72-second window during which Big Ear was able to observe it, but has not been detected since, despite several subsequent attempts by Ehman and others. Many hypotheses have been advanced on the origin of the emission, including natural and human-made sources, but none of them adequately explain the signal.

Although the Wow! signal had no detectable modulation—a technique used to transmit information over radio waves—it remains the strongest candidate for an extraterrestrial radio transmission ever detected.

Background 
In a 1959 paper, Cornell University physicists Philip Morrison and Giuseppe Cocconi had speculated that any extraterrestrial civilization attempting to communicate via radio signals might do so using a frequency of  megahertz (-centimeter spectral line), which is naturally emitted by hydrogen, the most common element in the universe and therefore likely familiar to all technologically advanced civilizations.

In 1973, after completing an extensive survey of extragalactic radio sources, Ohio State University assigned the now-defunct Ohio State University Radio Observatory (nicknamed "Big Ear") to the scientific search for extraterrestrial intelligence (SETI), in the longest-running program of this kind in history. The radio telescope was located near the Perkins Observatory on the campus of Ohio Wesleyan University in Delaware, Ohio.

By 1977, Ehman was working at the SETI project as a volunteer; his job involved analyzing by hand large amounts of data processed by an IBM 1130 computer and recorded on line printer paper. While perusing data collected on August 15 at 22:16 EDT (02:16 UTC), he spotted a series of values of signal intensity and frequency that left him and his colleagues astonished.
The event was later documented in technical detail by the observatory's director.

Signal measurement 

The string 6EQUJ5, commonly misinterpreted as a message encoded in the radio signal, represents in fact the signal's intensity variation over time, expressed in the particular measuring system adopted for the experiment. The signal itself appeared to be an unmodulated continuous wave, although any modulation with a period of less than 10 seconds or longer than 72 seconds would not have been detectable.

Intensity 
The signal intensity was measured as signal-to-noise ratio, with the noise (or baseline) averaged over the previous few minutes. The signal was sampled for 10 seconds and then processed by the computer, which took 2 seconds. The result for each frequency channel was output on the printout as a single alphanumeric character, representing the 10-second average intensity, minus the baseline, expressed as a dimensionless multiple of the signal's standard deviation.

In this particular intensity scale, a space character denoted an intensity between 0 and 1, that is between baseline and one standard deviation above it. The numbers 1 to 9 denoted the correspondingly numbered intensities (from 1 to 9); intensities of 10 and above were indicated by a letter: "A" corresponded to intensities between 10 and 11, "B" to 11 to 12, and so on. The Wow! signal's highest measured value was "U" (an intensity between 30 and 31), that is thirty standard deviations above background noise.

Frequency 
If due to blue-shift, it would correspond to the source moving about  towards Earth.

An explanation of the difference between Ehman's value and Kraus's can be found in Ehman's paper. However, the university's purchasing department made a typographical error in the order and wrote  (i.e.,  higher than desired). The software used in the experiment was then written to adjust for this error. When Ehman computed the frequency of the Wow! signal, he took this error into account.

Bandwidth 
It is considered narrowband emission in the sense that its fractional bandwidth was relatively small (~1%). However, the  bandwidth is not small compared to the bandwidth of some astrophysical masers (~) or to the frequency resolution of modern narrowband SETI searches (~). The Big Ear telescope was equipped with a receiver capable of measuring fifty -wide channels. The output from each channel was represented in the computer printout as a column of alphanumeric intensity values. The Wow! signal is essentially confined to one column.

Time variation 
At the time of the observation, the Big Ear radio telescope was only adjustable for altitude (or height above the horizon), and relied on the rotation of the Earth to scan across the sky. Given the speed of Earth's rotation and the spatial width of the telescope's observation window, the Big Ear could observe any given point for just 72 seconds. A continuous extraterrestrial signal, therefore, would be expected to register for exactly 72 seconds, and the recorded intensity of such signal would display a gradual increase for the first 36 seconds—peaking at the center of the observation window—and then a gradual decrease as the telescope moved away from it. All these characteristics are present in the Wow! signal.

Celestial location 

The precise location in the sky where the signal apparently originated is uncertain due to the design of the Big Ear telescope, which featured two feed horns, each receiving a beam from slightly different directions, while following Earth's rotation. The Wow! signal was detected in one beam but not in the other, and the data was processed in such a way that it is impossible to determine which of the two horns received the signal. There are, therefore, two possible right ascension (RA) values for the location of the signal (expressed below in terms of the two main reference systems):

{| class="wikitable" style="border: none;"
|-
|style="border: none; background: white;"|
! B1950 equinox
! J2000 equinox
|-
! RA (positive horn)
| 
| 
|-
! RA (negative horn)
| 
| 
|}

In contrast, the declination was unambiguously determined to be as follows:

{| class="wikitable" style="border: none;"
|-
|style="border: none; background: white;"|
! B1950 equinox
! J2000 equinox
|-
! Declination
| 
| 
|}

The galactic coordinates for the positive horn are =11.7°, =−18.9°, and for the negative horn =11.9°, =−19.5°, both being therefore about 19° toward the southeast of the galactic plane, and about 24° or 25° east of the Galactic Center. The region of the sky in question lies northwest of the globular cluster M55, in the constellation Sagittarius, roughly 2.5 degrees south of the fifth-magnitude star group Chi Sagittarii, and about 3.5 degrees south of the plane of the ecliptic. The closest easily visible star is Tau Sagittarii.

Initially, no nearby Sun-like stars were known to lie within the antenna coordinates, although in any direction the antenna pattern would encompass about six distant Sun-like stars as estimated in 2016.  In 2022, a paper published in the International Journal of Astrobiology identified three likely Sun-like stars within the antenna-pointed coordinates. The better characterized star, 2MASS 19281982-2640123, is located 1,800 light years away, only 132 light years away from Maccone's estimation where an intelligent civilization is more likely to exist. The other two candidates, 2MASS 19252173-2713537 and 2MASS 19282229-2702492, were insufficiently characterized but still likely to be Sun-like stars. Also, 14 other catalogued stars at the antenna coordinates may still turn out to be similar to the Sun after more data becomes available. As a response to the discovery, Breakthrough Listen conducted the first targeted search for the Wow! Signal in its first collaboration between the Green Bank Telescope and the Allen Telescope Array of the SETI Institute. The observations were performed on May 21, 2022, lasting 1 hour from Greenbank, 35 minutes from ATA, and 9 minutes and 40 seconds simultaneously. No technosignature candidates were found.

Hypotheses on the signal's origin 
A number of hypotheses have been advanced as to the source and nature of the Wow! signal, but none have achieved widespread acceptance. Interstellar scintillation of a weaker continuous signal—similar in effect to atmospheric twinkling—could be an explanation, but that would not exclude the possibility of the signal being artificial in origin. The significantly more sensitive Very Large Array did not detect the signal, and the probability that a signal below the detection threshold of the Very Large Array could be detected by the Big Ear due to interstellar scintillation is low. Other hypotheses include a rotating lighthouse-like source, a signal sweeping in frequency, or a one-time burst.

Ehman said in 1994: "We should have seen it again when we looked for it 50 times. Something suggests it was an Earth-sourced signal that simply got reflected off a piece of space debris." He later somewhat recanted his skepticism, after further research showed the unrealistic requirements that a space-borne reflector would need to have to produce the observed signal.
In a 1997 paper, Ehman resists "drawing vast conclusions from half-vast data"—acknowledging the possibility that the source may have been military or otherwise a product of Earth-bound humans. In a 2019 interview with John Michael Godier, Ehman stated: "I'm convinced that the Wow! signal certainly has the potential of being the first signal from extraterrestrial intelligence."

METI president Douglas Vakoch told Die Welt that any putative SETI signal detections must be replicated for confirmation, and the lack of such replication for the Wow! signal means it has little credibility.

Discredited hypotheses 
In 2017, Antonio Paris, Assistant Professor of Astronomy and Astrophysics at St. Petersburg College, Florida, proposed that the hydrogen cloud surrounding two comets, 266P/Christensen and 335P/Gibbs, now known to have been in the same region of the sky, could have been the source of the Wow! signal. This hypothesis was dismissed by astronomers, including members of the original Big Ear research team, as the cited comets were not in the beam at the correct time. Furthermore, comets do not emit strongly at the frequencies involved, and there is no explanation for why a comet would be observed in one beam but not in the other.

Searches for recurrence of the signal 
Several attempts were made by Ehman and other astronomers to recover and identify the signal. The signal was expected to occur three minutes apart in each of the telescope's feed horns, but that did not happen. Ehman unsuccessfully searched for recurrences using Big Ear in the months after the detection.

In 1987 and 1989, Robert H. Gray searched for the event using the META array at Oak Ridge Observatory, but did not detect it. In a July 1995 test of signal detection software to be used in its upcoming Project Argus, SETI League executive director H. Paul Shuch made several drift-scan observations of the Wow! signal's coordinates with a 12-meter radio telescope at the National Radio Astronomy Observatory in Green Bank, West Virginia, also achieving a null result.

In 1995 and 1996, Gray again searched for the signal using the Very Large Array, which is significantly more sensitive than Big Ear. Gray and Simon Ellingsen later searched for recurrences of the event in 1999 using the 26-meter radio telescope at the University of Tasmania's Mount Pleasant Radio Observatory. Six 14-hour observations were made at positions in the vicinity, but nothing like the Wow! signal was detected.

Response 
In 2012, on the 35th anniversary of the Wow! signal, Arecibo Observatory beamed a digital stream towards Hipparcos 34511, 33277, and 43587. The transmission consisted of approximately 10,000 Twitter messages solicited for the purpose by the National Geographic Channel, bearing the hashtag "#ChasingUFOs" (a promotion for one of the channel's TV series). The sponsor also included a series of video vignettes featuring verbal messages from various celebrities.

To increase the probability that any extraterrestrial recipients would recognize the signal as an intentional communication from another intelligent life form, Arecibo scientists attached a repeating-sequence header to each individual message, and beamed the transmission at roughly 20 times the power of the most powerful commercial radio transmitter.

In popular culture 
 In 1995, H. Paul Shuch composed the filk song "Ballad of the 'Wow!' Signal", which is sung to the tune of "Ballad of Springhill" (about the Springhill mine disaster of 1958) by Peggy Seeger.
 In 2016, Jean-Michel Jarre released the "Oxygène 17" music video, which is dedicated to the Wow! signal.
 In a 2017 Super Bowl commercial from Avocados From Mexico spoofing conspiracy theories such as the Moon landing hoax, Area 51, and subliminal advertising, the base of a stone monolith carries the inscription "6EQUJ5".
 "6EQUJ5" is the title of the first track on Carbon Based Lifeforms 2021 album Stochastic.
 The signal is featured in the PBS fictionalization First Contact: An Alien Encounter.

See also 
 List of interstellar radio messages
 
 BLC1 (Breakthrough Listen Candidate 1), signal detected in 2019
 
 
 Radio source SHGb02+14a
 Oh-My-God particle

References

External links 

 Location on Google Sky
 Location on YourSky

1977 in Ohio
1977 in science
August 1977 events in the United States
Radio spectrum
Sagittarius (constellation)
Search for extraterrestrial intelligence
Unsolved problems in astronomy
Ohio State University
IBM 1130